USS William B. Preston (DD-344/AVP-20/AVD-7) was a Clemson-class destroyer in the United States Navy following World War I. She was named for United States Secretary of the Navy and United States Senator William B. Preston.

Construction and commissioning
William B. Preston was laid down on 18 November 1918 at the Norfolk Navy Yard, Portsmouth, Virginia; launched on 9 August 1919; sponsored by Mrs. William Radford Beale, the eldest daughter of William B. Preston; designated DD-344 on 17 July 1920; and commissioned on 23 August 1920.

Service history

1920s

Following commissioning, William B. Preston operated with Destroyer Division (DesDiv) 19 and conducted trials and training off the east coast through the end of 1920. She then proceeded south to join the Fleet in Guantánamo Bay, Cuba, for winter maneuvers. After these exercises, she transited the Panama Canal to participate in the Fleet's visit to Callao, Peru, and arrived at that port on 21 January 1921.

The ship next received orders transferring her to DesDiv 45, Destroyer Squadron (DesRon) 14; and she joined the Asiatic Fleet in mid-1922. With her home port at Cavite, near Manila in the Philippines, the destroyer cruised with her division on exercises and maneuvers. In the summer months, the ships would base out of Chefoo on the north coast of Shantung province, China, while moving southward to Philippine waters for the winter exercises. In between, there were visits to China coastal ports such as Amoy, Foochow, and Swatow and occasional tours on the Yangtze River between Shanghai and Hankow.

Nanking Incident

In 1926, civil strife broke out in China which can be loosely characterized as a struggle between north and south for control of the country. To the south, the Nationalist Kuomintang party moved north from its base at Canton to extend its controls over warlord-dominated areas. Led by Chiang Kai-shek, the Nationalists had reached Nanking by March 1927.

William B. Preston arrived in that port on the Yangtze River on 21 March and dropped anchor off the city, joining sister ship . Under orders to evacuate Americans, the destroyers took on 175 refugees – 102 on Noa and 73 on William B. Preston.

Gunfire, coming closer to the city, alerted the American destroyermen to the danger posed by the approaching Cantonese. Northern Chinese troops meanwhile melted away from the city that they were supposed to defend, leaving many foreigners endangered in the defenseless city. An armed guard from Noa stood by on shore while signal parties from William B. Preston and Noa transmitted the information about the tense conditions in Nanking to the ships anchored in the muddy river.

When the situation had worsened to a point of no return, Noa commenced firing with her 4-inch guns; William B. Preston joined in with her main battery as well and, in the 10-minute barrage, fired 22 rounds of 4-inch projectiles to scare off the invading soldiers. Sailors on both American ships also provided fire with bolt-action Springfield rifles and drum-fed Lewis guns. British cruiser  and destroyer  added to the din with their guns; and the Chinese, faced by this Anglo-American barrage, withdrew.

Four days later, with the situation much quieter in Nanking, William B. Preston prepared to leave the area in company with refugee-laden SS Kungwo on 25 March. Snipers, firing from concealed positions ashore, sent the destroyer's anchor detail scurrying for cover; and ricocheting bullets whined into the pre-dawn darkness. Firing from a Lewis gun on the destroyer soon caused the sniper to cease fire. The ship, with civilians on board, was soon underway heading downriver.

Three hours later, while proceeding between Silver Island and Hsing Shan fort, small arms fire again crackled from the shore, first directed at Fungwo and next at William B. Preston. Bluejackets on the destroyer promptly broke out their Lewis guns and Springfields to reply, but the situation suddenly worsened when a 3-inch gun at the fort opened fire on the ships.

One shell splashed into the muddy river ahead of the destroyer; another fell in the ship's wake; and the third passed through the fire control platform. The destroyer's number one 4-inch gun was quickly trained around and fired three salvos in reply which, in addition to small arms and machine gun fire from the warship, caused the firing from the shore to be silenced.

William B. Preston and her charges joined British gunboat Cricket and SS Wen-chow 52 miles below Chinkiang. Snipers once again harassed the Anglo-American flotilla, but machine-gun fire from Cricket soon forced the Chinese to withdraw.

After turning Kungwo over to the British gunboat, William B. Preston returned to Nanking unhampered by further sniping. On 27 March, with 70 more refugees embarked, the ship cleared Nanking and headed downriver. Lt. Cmdr. G. B. Ashe, the ship's commanding officer, recalled that the Chinese had emplaced a field-piece at a key river bend and, accordingly, ordered general quarters well in advance.

Cleared for action with guns trained out and the Stars and Stripes flying, William B. Preston rounded the bend, ready for a showdown. The Chinese, however, allowed the ship to pass without any firing.

Receiving the Yangtze Service Medal for these actions against snipers while convoying American nationals out of the troubled areas, William B. Preston returned to routine cruising soon thereafter. She was back in the United States by 1929, homeported at San Diego, and assigned to the Battle Force.

1930s

To meet the obligations imposed by the naval treaties of the 1920s and 1930s, William B. Preston was part of a group of destroyers laid up in reserve at Philadelphia. She was decommissioned there on 15 October 1934.

As America's Navy grew in the first months following the outbreak of World War II in Europe, the need for auxiliaries to support the Fleet multiplied accordingly. On 18 November 1939, William B. Preston was selected for conversion to a small seaplane tender and redesignated AVP-20. Soon thereafter, the ship entered the New York Navy Yard for conversion.

William B. Preston was recommissioned on 14 June 1940. On 2 August 1940, the ship was reclassified again, this time to destroyer-seaplane tender, and redesignated AVD-7.

She departed the New York area three days later and arrived at Hampton Roads the following day. On 11 August, she headed for the Caribbean and arrived at Guantánamo Bay, Cuba, four days later. She then steamed to Panama, transited the canal on 24 August, and proceeded on to San Diego, where she arrived on 5 September for an eight-day pause en route to Hawaii.

After mooring to a Submarine Base pier at Pearl Harbor on 19 September, the ship commenced operations with the Fleet. She engaged in such tasks as tending scout planes, towing targets during fleet exercises, and making routine offshore patrols through 30 September. She then anchored at Palmyra Island to tend PBY Catalinas through 4 October, when she returned to Pearl Harbor.

As patrol plane reinforcements flew over the Pacific, bound for the Asiatic Fleet, William B. Preston served as a plane guard for three days in October and then resumed her routine duties out of Pearl Harbor. On 6 December 1940, the seaplane tender set course for the Philippines and her second tour of duty with the Asiatic Fleet.

En route, she lay to at plane guard station "George," while VP-26 passed overhead on course for the Philippine Islands. She arrived at Apra Harbor on 17 December but soon pressed onward and completed the last leg of her voyage to the Philippines when she anchored in Cañacao Bay, off the Cavite Navy Yard, on 22 December 1940.

After operating in the Manila area through Christmas 1940, the tender took station at Puerto Princessa Harbor, near the island of Palawan, where she tended PBY's to mid-January 1941. Moving on to Tutu Bay, Jolo, on 15 January, she visited Igat Bay and Caldera Bay, both off Mindanao, before returning to Cañacao Bay on 8 February.

From February to November 1941, the Asiatic Fleet continued its preparations. While some fleet units, including the majority of the destroyers, were sent south, William B. Preston was maintained in readiness in the Philippines for any eventuality. She tended PBY's and occasionally acted as target tug for fleet maneuvers in the southern islands in the Philippine archipelago. After an overhaul at the Cavite Navy Yard in November, she departed the Manila area on 1 December, bound for the southeastern coast of Mindanao.

Upon her arrival in Davao Gulf, the ship dropped anchor in Malalag Bay, where she was joined by a group of PBYs of the newly formed Patrol Wing 10 which soon commenced patrols. The planes reconnoitered several small bays and inlets, looking out for strange ships or for any signs of suspicious activity.

World War II

1941
Shortly after 0300 on 8 December 1941, William B. Preston picked up the following radio message: "Japan has commenced hostilities. Govern yourselves accordingly."

Japan had launched a devastating air strike on Pearl Harbor while their invasion fleets moved southward from Indochina towards the raw-material-rich British and Dutch possessions in Malaya and the East Indies. The Philippines, too, were on the timetable for conquest.

Soon after the receipt of the notification of war, all of the planes tended by the destroyer-seaplane tender were readied for operations. Two remained behind while the rest flew off on their first war patrols over the Celebes Sea. The ship, meanwhile, shifted anchorage away from the two moored Catalinas to lessen the chance of one bomb damaging both ship and planes in one fell swoop. Bluejackets on William B. Preston belted ammunition for the ship's antiaircraft defense of four .50-caliber water-cooled Browning machine guns and took down the awnings which had shielded the crew from the tropical sun.

Around 0800, the ship's commanding officer, Lt. Comdr. Etheridge Grant, went forward to check the progress of the preparations to slip the anchor chain (should that become necessary). Suddenly a lookout called out, "Aircraft!" Grant sprinted to the bridge while Japanese planes swept around the narrow neck of the land shielding Malalag Bay from the broad Gulf of Davao. This was the first U.S.–Japanese combat in the Philippines of World War II.

Going for the seaplanes first, the "Claudes" made short work of the Catalinas riding at their mooring buoys. Within a few short moments, both PBY's had been shot to pieces and sank into the waters of the bay as the survivors, carrying one dead and one wounded comrade with them, swam for shore.

Meanwhile, the ship lowered a boat to pick up survivors while she got underway for the open sea. Slipping her anchor chain, William B. Preston zigzagged across the bay as both "Claudes" and "Vals" attacked the fleeing tender. Evading the bombs, the ship managed to emerge from the attack unscathed and returned to the bay to pick up her boat and the survivors from the two lost planes.

Later that day, upon receipt of orders dispatching her to Moro Gulf, William B. Preston got underway to establish another advance base for PBY's at Police Bay. Retiring from Davao Gulf, the destroyer-seaplane tender slipped past four Japanese destroyers whose attention was probably focused on bigger game elsewhere. One hour later, a snooping Japanese plane picked up the ship's scent and trailed her for three hours, leading those on board William B. Preston to suspect that the Japanese were sending out a second strike to finish the job begun earlier. Steering as close to the shoreline as safe navigation would permit, Lt. Cmdr. Grant prepared to beach the ship should that prove necessary, but the plane departed and left the seaplane tender alone.

Arriving off the mouth of Moro Bay in the afternoon, the ship lay to until the following morning, 9 December, when she entered the bay. An explosion ahead of the ship sent the American bluejackets to their general quarters stations before it was discovered that the local fishermen were just out dynamiting for their catch.

The ship found a PBY awaiting her arrival and commenced tending operations. After being informed that Japanese troops had landed north of Gagayan and were marching overland to Police, the ship prepared to get underway and dispatched the PBY's on patrol over the Celebes Sea. Leaving word that the planes were to rendezvous with the ship at Tutu Bay, Jolo, William B. Preston got underway on 10 December.

The ship arrived at Tutu Bay later that day and found the PBY's awaiting her, after having found no trace of enemy activity during their patrol sweeps. At sunset, a veritable procession of masts and funnels moved across the southern horizon; and the men on the William B. Preston could only guess to whom they belonged.

The following day, the planes were again sent out on patrols while the ship upped anchor and proceeded for Tawi Tawi, receiving word en route that the PBY's were to return to Lake Lanao in Mindanao and the OS2U's were to rendezvous with the ship at Tawi Tawi. Although she had never hoisted aboard any aircraft before, William B. Preston's bluejackets rigged up a crude cradle between the two 50-foot motor-boats aft and provided padding for the Kingfisher's center float with mattresses and life jackets. One OS2U was taken aboard and berthed in this fashion while the other was towed astern. Smooth seas and a 15-knot pace facilitated the towing operation, and the two planes arrived safely at Tarakan, Borneo.

Met by two Dutch destroyers, Kortenaer and Witte de With, the seaplane tender made port at Tarakanbut was soon underway again, this time for Balikpapan, Borneo, joining many ships from the Asiatic Fleet (and Heron. Two hours after arrival, the ship received orders to accompany the small fleet to Makassar and got underway on 13 December.

After arriving at Makassar, William B. Preston spent three days provisioning and catching up on news of the progress of the war. The latter looked bleak, as Japanese forces swept southward, sweeping everything before them and forcing Allied naval, air, and ground units southward into the East Indies. The ship arrived at Sourabaya, Java, shortly before Christmas but, after further provisioning and fueling, departed the Dutch naval base there on the 27th.

1942

The ship arrived at Darwin, Australia, on the day after New Year's Day 1942 and soon received orders to provision to capacity and take on large stocks of spare parts, food, and replacement crews for the decimated ranks of personnel in PatWing 10. The ship then proceeded north for Ambon, in the Dutch East Indies, crowded with 100 extra men and much topside freight.

Upon her arrival at Ambon, the destroyer-seaplane tender found sister ship  and passed that ship enough fuel to enable her to reach Darwin. After delivering her embarked men and cargo, William B. Preston proceeded to Kendari, where she was camouflaged to blend in with the verdant hillside to which she was moored - in fact, she was so well camouflaged that her PBYs had trouble locating her when they returned to their base.

For the remainder of January and into February, the ship continued her tending operations as the forces combating the Japanese rapidly dwindled. On 12 February 1942, William B. Preston dropped anchor at Darwin to commence tending PBYs from that base in northern Australia. In about a week, her fuel began running low, forcing Lt. Comdr. Grant to go ashore to arrange for a delivery of much-needed fuel and gasoline to the ship.

At 0955, lookouts called down "large formations of planes approaching" and the ship went to general quarters. Within minutes, the ship was underway. Zigzagging her way through the crowded harbor, William B. Preston made for the open sea.

The first wave of planes attacked the town and its nearby fuel dumps and docks; the second wave went after the ships in the harbor, with transports and cargo ships as the primary objectives. Within minutes of each other, transports Tulagi and Meigs took hits; and ships alongside the docks were heavily hit as bombs rained indiscriminately on the port area.

Four bombs exploded off William B. Preston's bow, breaking bridge windows. The .30- and .50-caliber antiaircraft fire forced some of the attackers to keep their distance, but others pressed the attack with vigor. , slower in getting underway, was enveloped in bomb splashes as Japanese accuracy marked the ship for destruction. Heavily hit, Peary burst into flames and rapidly became an inferno as bomb after bomb tore the ship apart and sank her down by the stern.

The Preston's turn was next, however; and she was hit aft, just forward of the after deckhouse. The ship lost steering control forward; and, in the interim period between regaining control by hand-steering aft, Lt. Wood conned and steered the ship using her engines and, despite a jammed rudder, succeeded in making for an opening in the harbor boom. Negotiating it by "judicious use of engines and slight assistance from the rudder with direct hand steering," William B. Preston escaped the inferno that left Darwin shattered and ruined as a base of operations for the Allies.

Heading south down the western coast of Australia, the ship took stock of her damage. Eleven men were killed, two missing, and three wounded by the bomb hit aft.

Note on casualties: Kriloff(2000) states 10 deaths. Kriloff (2002) states 15 Deaths. Eight deaths and two Missing in action is confirmed by. However the Ship's log for 19 February lists the following casualties Gluba, Kerns, Redfern and Simpson not being mentioned on the previous "Report of Changes".
 
The after living compartment was a mass of wreckage; rivets were popped and seams sprung; the after deck house was riddled with holes; the after 4-inch and machine guns had been put out of action. At about 1445, a Japanese ("Mavis" patrol plane attacked the ship, but her bombs splashed harmlessly into the ship's wake, and the plane discontinued her attack.

Proceeding to Derby, Western Australia, William B. Preston touched briefly on a shoal as she entered the harbor, and reduced the effective speed of the starboard engine down to eight knots. Meanwhile, the single remaining PBY attached to the ship returned from Darwin with the men who had gone ashore and had been caught away from the ship during the attack, including Lt. Cmdr. Grant, who had been blown out of a motorboat while returning to the ship.

On 23 February, the damaged William B. Preston proceeded for Broome, Australia, and was soon joined by Childs and Heron, who both assisted the damaged seaplane tender in making emergency repairs. As Java fell, to the north, three of William B. Preston's planes served in the evacuation of Surabaya and Tjilatjap. Meanwhile, the ship received orders to proceed for Fremantle for repairs.

Upon arrival, however, there were not sufficient facilities available to effect the needed yard work, so the ship was routed on to Sydney. There, on the east coast of Australia, William B. Preston received a much-needed overhaul and repair period. Her old 4-inch guns were replaced by 3-inch antiaircraft guns, while 20-millimeter Oerlikons were added as well to augment her close-in antiaircraft capability. Following her availability, the ship proceeded to Fremantle and reported for duty to Commander, Patrol Wing 10, in June 1942.

Java had fallen, as had the Philippines and Malaya. Thus, the Australian sub-continent stood as the last Allied territory in the southwest Pacific to oppose further Japanese expansion. Operating out of Fremantle, the destroyer-seaplane tender alternated with Heron and Childs at such advance bases as Exmouth Gulf and Fremantle through the early summer of 1942.

Anchored in the vicinity of Bay of Rest, Exmouth Gulf, Western Australia, William B. Preston continued her operations as a seaplane tender through early July, attached to Patrol Wing 10 and servicing two PBY-5 planes. One plane conducted a daily patrol as far as Broome, while the other remained at a buoy near the ship with her crew living on board the tender. The ship's log noted that she was "in all respects ready to slip anchor and get underway instantly—-day or night." The calm waters of the bay and the generally perfect flying weather combined to greatly facilitate flight operations.

Relieved by Heron on 14 July, the ship cleared Exmouth Gulf, bound for Fremantle for general upkeep. Securing alongside  at north dock, Fremantle, she commenced a yard period, taking on fuel, gasoline, and provisions over the next eight days, departing on 26 July. She steamed back to Exmouth Gulf and relieved Heron on the 29th.

1943

For the remainder of 1942 and into 1943, William B. Preston continued this general routine, exchanging tender duties with Heron and Childs and undergoing periodic general upkeep at Fremantle. In February 1943, a heavy storm hit Exmouth Gulf, sending two PBYs onto a reef. A third Catalina took off despite the typhoon and made its way through sheets of rain and thick clouds to safely arrive at Geraldton. Within two days, replacement planes had arrived; and William B. Preston recommenced tender operations.

On 1 April, the seaplane tender moved to Shark Bay, Western Australia, to serve as an advance base; she subsequently tended PBYs for a time at West Lewis Island, near Enderby Island, Western Australia. Later, following the month of January 1944, in which the ship received full overhaul and upkeep, William B. Preston operated out of Fremantle on submarine exercises serving as a target vessel for the submarines operating out of that port. She continued these activities through the spring and summer of 1944.

1944

At Darwin, on 18 August, the ship embarked the Deputy Commander, Fleet Air Wing 10, and other men from that unit for transportation to the Admiralty Islands. After departing Australia, she proceeded to New Guinea, arriving at Milne Bay on 22 August. Pushing on to the Admiralties, the ship dropped anchor at Manus on the 24th, disembarking her passengers and fueling preparatory to heading for the Ellice Islands. The ship made Funafuti on 31 August.

Attached to Service Force, Pacific Fleet, and under orders from Commander, Air, Pacific Fleet (ComAir-Pac), William B. Preston headed for the United States. Stopping briefly at Palmyra Island and Pearl Harbor en route to the west coast, the seaplane tender arrived at San Francisco on 18 September. She then proceeded to San Pedro, Los Angeles, and thence to Terminal Island for overhaul.

From 1 October to 8 November, William B. Preston underwent voyage repairs and alterations to her armament. The ship also received a much-needed drydocking for bottom work before getting underway for post-repair trials which concluded on 16 November.

For the remainder of 1944, the destroyer-seaplane tender operated as plane guard and antisubmarine escort ship out of San Diego.

1945

After spending New Year's Day 1945 at San Diego, William B. Preston continued plane guarding and screening duties, clearing her home port on 2 January to join Matanikau off the California coast. During flight operations on 3 January, a Hellcat crashed while taking off, and the destroyer-seaplane tender sped to the rescue. The ship's whaleboat, soon in the water, rescued the soaked pilot, and William B. Preston subsequently returned the aviator to his carrier via highline transfer.

For the remainder of January and into February, the ship's duties continued to be much in the same vein, until she returned to the Bethlehem Steel repair yard at Alameda, California, on 14 February, for availability. She remained in dockyard hands until the 21st, after which time she rejoined Matanikau during further carrier qualification trials.

On 26 July, a wave caved in the forward port in the ship's office, flooding the radio room and putting it out of commission. Detached from further duty, she returned to San Diego where repairs could be made.

War's end on 15 August 1945 found the venerable destroyer-seaplane tender at anchor in San Diego harbor.

As newer AVPs joined the Fleet and the end of the war made further expansion unnecessary, the need for older ships like William B. Preston diminished. The ship departed the west coast and arrived at Philadelphia on 9 October 1945 for preparation for disposal.

Decommissioning and disposal

On 6 December 1945, William B. Preston was decommissioned; and, on 3 January 1946, her name was struck from the Navy list. On 6 November 1946, the Northern Metals Company, of Philadelphia, purchased the hulk for scrapping.

Awards and honors
William B. Preston received one battle star for her World War II service.

Notes

References
 Kriloff, Herbert. Officer of the deck : a memoir of the Pacific War and the sea. Pacifica, Calif. : Pacifica Press, c2000.
 Kriloff, Herbert. Proceed orange : assume command. Canada : Detselig Enterprises Ltd., c2002.
 
 Messimer, Dwight R. In the hands of fate : the story of Patrol Wing Ten, 8 December 1941 – 11 May 1942. Annapolis, Md. : Naval Institute Press, c1985.
 Winslow, Walter G. The fleet the gods forgot : Annapolis, Md. : Naval Institute Press, c1982.

External links

http://www.navsource.org/archives/05/344.htm

Clemson-class destroyers
World War II mine warfare vessels of the United States
Seaplane tenders of the United States Navy
Ships built in Portsmouth, Virginia
1919 ships